Jarwa is a village in the Uttar Pradesh province of northern India 5 kilometres south of the border with Nepal at Koilabas.  Nepalese and Indian nationals may cross the border unrestricted, however there is a customs checkpoint for goods.  Tulsipur is the nearest town inside India.

References

Villages in Balrampur district, Uttar Pradesh
Transit and customs posts along the India–Nepal border